Jangada is a municipality in the Brazilian state of Mato Grosso.

References

Municipalities in Mato Grosso
Populated places established in 1945